Ad Wammes (born 1953, Vreeswijk) is a Dutch composer. His notable compositions include pieces "Miroir" ("Mirror", 1989) for organ, and "Different Colours", two books which contain 12 pieces each for piano.

References

External links 
 Ad Wammes website

1953 births
Living people
Dutch male classical composers
Dutch classical composers
People from Nieuwegein
Date of birth missing (living people)